The Cambridge Modern History is a comprehensive modern history of the world, beginning with the 15th century Age of Discovery, published by the Cambridge University Press in England and also in the United States.

The first series, planned by Lord Acton and edited by him with Stanley Mordaunt Leathes, Sir Adolphus William Ward and G. W. Prothero, was launched in 1902 and totalled fourteen volumes, the last of them being an historical atlas which appeared in 1912. The period covered was from 1450 to 1910. Each volume includes an extensive bibliography.

A second series, with entirely new editors and contributors, The New Cambridge Modern History, appeared in fourteen volumes between 1957 and 1979, again concluding with an atlas. It covered the world from 1450 to 1945.

Planning and publishing

The original Cambridge Modern History was planned by Lord Acton, who during 1899 and 1900 gave much of his time to coordinating the project, intended to be a monument of objective, detailed, and collaborative scholarship. Acton was Regius professor of modern history at Cambridge, and a fellow of All Souls, Oxford. He had previously established the English Historical Review in 1886 and had an exalted reputation.

The new work was published in fourteen volumes between 1902 and 1912, in the British Isles by the Cambridge University Press and in the United States by Macmillan & Co. of New York City. Written mostly by English scholars, the first twelve volumes dealt with the history of the world from 1450 up to 1870. The final volume, numbered 12, was The Latest Age and appeared in 1910. There then followed two supplemental volumes.

The history was later followed by similar multi-volume works for the earlier ages, namely the Cambridge Ancient History and the Cambridge Medieval History. As the first of such histories, it later came to be seen as establishing a tradition of collaborative scholarship.

A second edition of the atlas (volume XIV) was published in 1924.

Volumes published

I. The Renaissance (1902)

II. The Reformation: The end of the Middle Ages (1903)

III. The Wars of Religion (1904)

IV. The Thirty Years War (1906)

V. The Age of Louis XIV (1908)

VI. The Eighteenth Century (1909)

VII. The United States (1903)
Scanned full text here (Archive.org)

VIII. The French Revolution (1904)

IX. Napoleon (1906)

X. The Restoration (1907)

XI. The Growth of Nationalities (1909)

XII. The Latest Age (1910)

XIII. Tables and General Index (1911)
This volume includes
A four-page addendum, written by Ernest Alfred Benians, to Chapter 9 of Volume 6: Naval Operations in the Period of the Seven Years' War
Genealogical Tables and Lists
1. Genealogical Tables of Ruling and Noble Houses (112 tables)
2. Lists of Spiritual Princes, Elected Sovereigns, Etc. (28 lists)
3. Lists of Parliaments, General Councils, Etc. (6 lists)
General Index to all volumes

XIV. Atlas (1912, 2nd ed. 1924)

This volume begins with an extensive introduction to the maps, written by Ernest Alfred Benians. It is divided into several sections:
I. Europe in the Fifteenth Century
II. The Age of Habsburg Power and of the Reformation
III. The Rise of France and Sweden
IV. The Formation of the Great Powers of the Eighteenth Century
V. The Age of the Revolution and of Napoleon
VI. Since 1815
Except for the first, each is in turn subsectioned for Europe and "Greater Europe", with the latter term referring mostly to the colonial empires. A separate index is provided for the introduction.

There are 141 maps in this volume. Two-page maps are bound in such a way as to prevent information from being lost in the gutter between pages. The concluding index gives the latitude and longitude of the places named.

Notes

References
 G. N. Clark, 'The Origins of the Cambridge Modern History', in Cambridge Historical Journal, VIII, 2 (1945), pp. 57–64

External links
 Cambridge Modern History
 

History books about the late modern period
Cambridge University Press books
1902 non-fiction books
Series of history books